Stian Omenås (born 5 May 1980) is a Norwegian Jazz musician (trumpet), music conductor and composer from Valldal in Norddal, Sunnmøre, known as leader of his own band Stian Omenås Ensemble and ""PARALLAX", and from collaborations with musicians like Louis Sclavis (FR), Terje Rypdal, Kenny Wheeler (UK), Django Bates (UK), Esperanza Spalding (US), Jon Balke, Ståle Storløkken, Christian Wallumrød, Frode Alnæs, Kim Myhr, Mats Eilertsen, Rob Waring, Erik Nylander, Eirik Hegdal, Trygve Seim, Nils Økland, Gjermund Larsen, Magnar Åm, Jai Shankar, Mira Craig, Elvira Nicolaisen, Heidi Gjermundsen Brock, Margaret Berger, Nora NoorKenny Wheeler, Petter Wettre, Odd Riisnæs, Thomas Johansson, Hayden Powell, Jacob Young, Jan Gunnar Hoff, Mats Eilertsen, Erik Nylander, Rob Waring, Roger Johansen and Tore Johansen.

Career 
Omenås was educated as a jazz trumpeter, trumpet teacher and composer on the Jazz program at Trondheim Musikkonsevatorium.  He now resides in Oslo. He is influenced by Miles Davis, Stravinskij, Bartok, Messiaen, Bach, Ligeti, Tom Waits, Björk and Thomas Dybdahl, among others, and currently (2013) working with the bands Stian Omenås Ensemble, Kilombo, Marita Røstad Band, Astrid E. Pedersen Ensemble, Bungalow, Miles Davis Tribute, Circulez with Louis Sclavis, and a solo project.

His album Klangkammer 1 (2012) with his band project Klangkammer, includes Mats Eilertsen (bass), Erik Nylander (drums) and Rob Waring (vibraphone).

Discography 

Within Stian Around A Hill Quartet
2009: Lille Stille (AIM Sound City)
2011: Alle Skal Få (Atterklang)

Within Parallax
2010: Live in the UK (FMR Records)
2012: Krutthuset (Pling Music)
2014: Den tredje dagen (NORCD)

Within Klangkammer
2012: Klangkammer 1 (NorCD)
2016: Klangkammer 2 (NorCD)

References

External links 

1980 births
Living people
Musicians from Ålesund
21st-century Norwegian trumpeters
Norwegian jazz trumpeters
Male trumpeters
Norwegian jazz composers
Norwegian University of Science and Technology alumni
Male jazz composers
21st-century Norwegian male musicians
NorCD artists
FMR Records artists